IEEE Transactions on Evolutionary Computation is a bimonthly peer-reviewed scientific journal published by the IEEE Computational Intelligence Society. It covers evolutionary computation and related areas including nature-inspired algorithms, population-based methods, and optimization where selection and variation are integral, and hybrid systems where these paradigms are combined. The editor-in-chief is Carlos A. Coello Coello (CINVESTAV). According to the Journal Citation Reports, the journal has a 2021 impact factor of 16.497.

The journal was established in 1997 by the IEEE Neural Networks Council, with David B. Fogel as founding editor-in-chief (1997-2002). Other editors-in-chief have included Xin Yao (2003-2008), Garrison Greenwood (2009-2014) and Kay Chen Tan (2015-2020).

References

External links

Transactions on Evolutionary Computation
Computer science journals
Bimonthly journals
English-language journals
Publications established in 1997